The Asquith coalition ministry was the Government of the United Kingdom under the Liberal Prime Minister H. H. Asquith from May 1915 to December 1916. It was formed as a multi-party war-time coalition nine months after the beginning of the First World War but collapsed when the Conservative Party withdrew.

History 

The new Cabinet included nine Conservatives and one Labour minister, but the Liberals continued to hold most of the important posts; the Conservatives had demanded Cabinet seats, but they only received lesser positions. Not at all satisfied, Conservative Party leader Bonar Law continued the verbal attacks.

The ministry collapsed on 5 December 1916 as a result of Conservative resignations, who refused to serve under Asquith's leadership. Asquith and most of the Liberals then moved into opposition, while the Conservatives formed a new coalition with a minority of Liberals, under the leadership of Liberal David Lloyd George, the next day.

Cabinet

List of ministers

See also

Notes

References 

 
 
 
 
 
 
 
 
 
 
 
 
 

British ministries
Coalition governments of the United Kingdom
Grand coalition governments
United Kingdom in World War I
1915 establishments in the United Kingdom
1916 disestablishments in the United Kingdom
Ministries of George V
Cabinets established in 1915
Cabinets disestablished in 1916
1910s in the United Kingdom
World War I-related lists
H. H. Asquith